Green Point Elementary School District is a public school district based in Humboldt County, California, United States.

External links
 Official district website

School districts in Humboldt County, California